Scot Racing Team is a motorcycle racing team from Italy. For 2009 it ran in MotoGP as a self-contained entity for the first time, running Hungarian rider Gábor Talmácsi on a Honda. They also continued with their long-time involvement in the 250cc class, running 2008 125cc runner-up Simone Corsi on a Honda. They withdrew from MotoGP at the end of the 2009 season.

History
The team's head office site in the Republic of San Marino and its technical department in Cesena, Italy. Since  the team has been using Honda motorcycles in all categories.

The team had a 7-year association with Andrea Dovizioso.

In  both team and rider moved to MotoGP. Team Scot began a collaboration with JiR, who had been running in MotoGP for three years under Konica Minolta branding. With Dovizioso as their sole rider, the team was the most competitive non-works Honda squad, scoring a podium and six other top-five finishes to place fifth overall. The collaboration with JiR ended at the end of the season, and Team Scot agreed to carry on in MotoGP under their sole banner. Lack of support led the team to withdraw from MotoGP at the end of the  season; the team will participate solely in the Moto2 category.

Team Scot riders included Bruno Casanova, Fausto Gresini, Emilio Alzamora, Sete Gibernau, Roberto Locatelli, Arnaud Vincent, Gábor Talmácsi, Mike Di Meglio, Yuki Takahashi and 2009 250cc World Champion, Hiroshi Aoyama.

References

External links
 scotracingteam.com

Motorcycle racing teams
Motorcycle racing teams established in 1992
1992 establishments in San Marino
Motorcycle racing teams disestablished in 2009
2009 disestablishments in Europe